The 42nd International 500-Mile Sweepstakes was held at the Indianapolis Motor Speedway on Friday, May 30, 1958. The event was part of the 1958 USAC National Championship Trail, and was also race 4 of 11 in the 1958 World Championship of Drivers. 

The race is best known for a massive first-lap, 15-car pileup that resulted in the death of fan-favorite driver Pat O'Connor.

Jimmy Bryan was the race winner. This marked the first time that one car would carry two drivers to separate wins at the race, in back-to-back years, with Sam Hanks winning the previous year's race in the same car.

The race featured young rookie A. J. Foyt's debut at Indy. On lap 148, he spun in an oil slick, blew out the tires, and dropped out of the race.

Juan Manuel Fangio arrived at Indy under much fanfare as he attempted to qualify for the Indy 500 and score points towards the World Championship. He practiced early in the month, but withdrew when he could not get up to speed.

Time trials
Time trials were scheduled for four days.

Saturday May 17 – Pole Day time trials
Ed Elisian set a new one-lap track record of 146.508 mph to sit tentatively on the pole position. His four-lap average stood at 145.926 mph. Later in the day, Dick Rathmann qualified at 145.974 mph to win the pole position. Rathmann was not able to beat Elisian's single-lap record, but his four-lap record eclipsed Elisian overall by a mere 0.08 seconds.
Sunday May 18 – Second day time trials
Saturday May 24 – Third day time trials
Sunday May 25 – Fourth day time trials

Race summary

Opening lap crash – Death of Pat O'Connor
For the second year in a row, the starting grid was assembled single-file in the pit lane. The cars were instructed to pull away and assemble into the official eleven rows of three after they entered the racing surface. Confusion occurred on the pace lap, however, as the three drivers of the front row (Dick Rathmann, Ed Elisian, and Jimmy Reece) pulled away, and inadvertently escaped the pace car. The three cars were alone, and rather than wait for the grid to catch up, they rushed around to catch up to the back of the field. Sam Hanks pulled the pace car off the track and into the pits, but chief starter Bill Vanderwater displayed the yellow flag to wave off the start. An extra pace lap was allowed, and the front row re-took their position at the front of the pack. By the time Hanks was ready to pull the pace car back out on the track, the field had re-formed, and Vanderwater gave them the green flag.

At the start, Dick Rathmann took the lead in turn 1, Ed Elisian was second, and Jimmy Reece third. As the cars battled into turn three, Elisian spun and took Rathmann to the outside wall, triggering a huge 15-car pileup. Reece braked and was hit from behind by Pat O'Connor. O'Connor's car sailed fifty feet in the air, landed upside down and burst into flames. Several other cars spun to the wall and into the infield. Jerry Unser touched wheels with Paul Goldsmith, and flipped over the outside wall. Unser suffered a dislocated shoulder.

Although O'Connor was incinerated in the accident, medical officials said that he was probably killed instantly from a fractured skull. Widely blamed for the accident, Elisian was suspended by USAC for the accident (reinstated a few days later), and was shunned by many in the racing community.

Following the accident, race officials announced that they would change the starting procedure, abandoning the single-file trip down pit lane that was used in 1957 and 1958. Also, for the 1959 Indy 500, metal roll bars welded to the frame behind the driver's head were mandated, and helmets were required to pass safety certification by Speedway medical officials.

First half
Jimmy Bryan escaped the opening lap crash, and came around to lead the first lap. Eddie Sachs and Tony Bettenhausen also got by unscathed, to run second and third. Due to the crash, the yellow light stayed on for 25 minutes (approximately 18 laps). Four of the top five starting positions were out of the race from the crash, including polesitter Dick Rathmann, who placed 27th.

After a lengthy cleanup, the green flag came back out around lap 19. Bryan, Sachs, Bettenhausen, and rookie George Amick all traded time in the lead. There were 14 lead changes in the first half.

The second yellow came out on lap 38 when Chuck Weyant crashed in turn 4.

Eddie Sachs, a contender in the first quarter of the race, dropped out on lap 68 with transmission trouble.

Second half
The second half of the race settled down to a battle between Jimmy Bryan and Johnny Boyd, with rookie George Amick also in contention. Boyd lost the lead during a pit stop on lap 126. Bryan's team had faster pit stops (three stops for 1 minute and 31 seconds), which allowed him to hold the lead.

Rookie A. J. Foyt spun out on lap 149. He hit an oil slick in turn one, went sideways, blowing out all four tires. The car did not make contact with the wall, but the engine stalled and Foyt was out of the race. He placed 16th.

With 25 laps to go, Boyd was running about one second behind Bryan, with Amick (a lap down in third place) running between them. Boyd suddenly slowed on lap 177 with a worn out right rear tire, sending him to the pits, and elevating Amick to second. Bryan led the final 75 laps (139 total) en route to victory. Bryan was victorious in the same car in which Sam Hanks won the 500 a year earlier. Amick stayed within striking distance of Bryan for the last part of the race, but Amick's crew chief decided to accept a safe second-place rather than risk pushing their rookie driver into a mistake.

During the race as the news of Pat O'Connor's death spread around the track, the mood among the spectators became somber and glum. Reportedly, some in attendance left the grounds upon hearing the news of the fatality, some never to return.

Box score 

Notes
 – Includes 1 point for fastest lead lap
All cars on Firestone tires

Alternates
First alternate: Gene Hartley (#24)

Failed to qualify

Fred Agabashian (#14, #56, #57, #75)
Tony Bonadies  (#58)
Bud Clemons  (#59)
Bob Cortner  (#93) – Did not finish rookie test
Ray Crawford (#49)
Jimmy Daywalt (#57, #69, #82)
Rex Easton  (#10, #72)
Don Edmunds (#92)
Jack Ensley  (#17)
Juan Manuel Fangio  (#54, #77)
Pat Flaherty (#5) – Entry declined, failed physical
Elmer George (#10, #28)
Joe Giba  (#62)
Gene Hartley (#24)
Al Herman (#68, #75)
Bill Homeier (#74, #95)
Van Johnson  (#58)
Jim McWithey  (#66)
Earl Motter  (#61) – Passed rookie test
Tom Pistone  (#66) – Entry declined, lack of experience
Eddie Russo (#55)
Troy Ruttman (#98)
Dutch Schaefer  (#61) – Entry declined, lack of experience
Carroll Shelby  (#17) – Did not begin rookie test
Marshall Teague (#18)
Leroy Warriner  (#95)

Broadcasting

Radio
The race was carried live on the IMS Radio Network. Sid Collins served as chief announcer. The broadcast reached 302 affiliates across all 48 states, as well as Armed Forces Network and Voice of America. For the final time, a 15-minute pre-race was used. The following year, the pre-race would be expanded to 30 minutes. The broadcast featured the debut of Lou Palmer, who reported from the normally quiet and remote third turn. However, on the opening lap, Palmer was quickly thrust into duty, as his first words on the network were to describe the massive 15-car pileup and fatal accident of Pat O'Connor.

Among the guests that visited the booth was Pete DePaolo.

In 2019, this entire race's radio broadcast became available as a paid digital download form the Indianapolis Motor Speedway website.

Race notes
Fastest Lead Lap: Tony Bettenhausen – 1:02.370 (144.300 mph)
Pat O'Connor had appeared on the cover of Sports Illustrated in the week leading up to the race. His subsequent death is considered an early example of the perceived "Sports Illustrated cover jinx."
 Only Appearance: George Amick (killed in 1959 USAC 100-mile race at Daytona)
 First Appearance: A. J. Foyt (First 4-time Indianapolis 500 winner.)

Formula One Championship standings after the race

Formula One Drivers' Championship standings

Formula One Constructors' Championship standings

 Notes: Only the top five positions are included for both sets of standings. Also, points scored in the 500 did not count towards the F1 constructors championship.

USAC points standings after the race
Note: Only the top 10 are listed

References

External links
Indianapolis 500 History: Race & All-Time Stats – Official Site
1958 Indianapolis 500 Radio Broadcast, Indianapolis Motor Speedway Radio Network

Indianapolis 500
Indianapolis 500
Indianapolis 500 races
Indianapolis 500
Indianapolis 500
Indianapolis 500